Redtenbacher may refer to:
 Ferdinand Redtenbacher (1809–1863), Austrian founder of science-based mechanical engineering
 Josef Redtenbacher (1810–1870), Austrian chemist
 Josef Redtenbacher  (1856–1926), Austrian entomologist
 Ludwig Redtenbacher (1814–1876), Austrian doctor and entomologist mainly interested in beetles

See also
Orville Redenbacher (1907–1995), American businessman